Galaxias globiceps is a species of fish in the family Galaxiidae endemic to Chile.

Habitat
Galaxias globiceps lives in a freshwater environment in a temperate climate.

Size

Range
The species is known only from the type locality at Los Alerces near Puerto Montt, Chile.

References

Notes
 

Galaxias
Freshwater fish of Chile
Taxa named by Carl H. Eigenmann
Fish described in 1928
Taxonomy articles created by Polbot
Endemic fauna of Chile